Tamik (also Romanized as Tamīk) is a village in Kork and Nartich Rural District, in the Central District of Bam County, Kerman Province, Iran. At the 2006 census, its population was 363, in 91 families.

References 

Populated places in Bam County